The Passions of the Mind is a 1971 novel by  American author Irving Stone. It is a biographical novel about the psychiatrist Sigmund Freud and covers his life from when he was a student to when he is forced to leave Austria to escape the growing influence of the Nazis. It covers many aspects of the subject's life, including his hospital work, his relationship with his parents, his marriage to Martha Bernays, and his support for his successor, Carl Jung. The book is notable for going into great detail of Freud's theories, especially the Oedipus Complex.

Irving Stone is best renowned for his several biographical novels, the best known being Lust for Life and The Agony and the Ecstasy (about the artists Vincent van Gogh and Michelangelo, respectively), which were both adapted into major Hollywood productions. Though less well known, Passions of the Mind was an American bestseller upon its release, spending 13 weeks at the top of the New York Times Bestseller List (fiction) in the spring of 1971, and nearly 30 weeks in the top 15.

References

1971 novels
Books about Sigmund Freud
Doubleday (publisher) books
Cultural depictions of Sigmund Freud
Cultural depictions of Carl Jung
Novels by Irving Stone